The Boys' Brigade in Singapore is a youth uniformed group organisation and part of the global Boys' Brigade movement which has been present in Singapore since 1930. It currently consists of over 700 officers and 6,300 Boys in over 116 companies. The current Brigade President is Patrick Koh Ley Boon and the Honorary President is Lieutenant-General (Ret) Winston Choo, the former Chief of Defence Force of the Singapore Armed Forces.

The Boys' Brigade in Singapore celebrated its 90th Anniversary in 2020 and has the distinguished honour of having the President of Singapore as its Patron.

History

The Boys' Brigade was introduced to Singapore by James Milner Fraser, an architect from Britain. He was a former member of the 23rd Aberdeen and the 23rd London Companies.

On 12 January 1930, Fraser started the 1st Singapore Company at Prinsep Street Presbyterian Church. With the aid of ex-Sergeant Quek Eng Moh of the 1st Swatow Company, he assembled 12 local Boys to form the company.

Progress was slow initially, but by the time the company was officially enrolled at Brigade Headquarters in London, in August 1930, the membership had risen to 40. The company chaplain was Reverend William Murray and Fraser's lieutenants were John McNeish (formerly of 76th Glasgow) and Dong Chui Sing. Bible class, drill, concerts, wayfaring, signalling, first aid, swimming, fencing, tumbling and other forms of physical recreation formed the core of the Boys' Brigade syllabus.

In the following year, the first camp was held at the Singapore Volunteer Camp at Siglap. A successful inspection was also held to bring the session to a close.

Extension soon followed, spearheaded by McNeish with the formation of the 2nd Singapore Company at Kampong Kapor Methodist Church in February 1931.

By 1936, the Singapore Battalion was 200-strong, with the 3rd Singapore (1933) started at the Anglo-Chinese Continuation School, the 5th Singapore (1934) at Choon Guan Presbyterian Boys School, 4th Singapore (1934) at Geylang Methodist Church and the 6th Singapore (1934) at Paya Lebar Methodist Church.

The Battalion Colors were presented to the battalion by Frank Cooper Sands(former brigade chairman of the Singapore Officers' Council and later an honorary vice-president of the Battalion) in 1936 and the drill competition was introduced. Fraser served as the Battalion President from 1936 to 1956. In 1940, he handed the captaincy of the 1st Singapore Company over to one of his Boys, S. P. Chua.

During the war years of 1942 to 1945, The Boys' Brigade's activities were suspended. To avoid desecration, the prized Singapore Battalion Colors were destroyed, but some of the coveted drums were stored away in a room at Prinsep Headquarters.

After the war, S. P. Chua revived the 1st Singapore Company. He was joined immediately by Fraser and by 1950, the Battalion had regained its old strength.

By 1968, there were 28 companies in Singapore. In 1971, the Brigade had the distinguished honour of having the President of the Republic of Singapore as its Patron.

As the Brigade approached its 85th Anniversary in 2015, it conducted its first Trooping of Colours parade and reunion dinner in over a decade with the then Education Minister Heng Swee Keat as the Guest-of-Honor.

Organisation

Headquarters
A list of honorary office-bearers include:

The Brigade Executive

The Brigade Executive is the decision making body of The Boys' Brigade. In January 2007, the Brigade implemented the Cluster Structure and grouped the BB Companies into 10 clusters with an average of 10 to 15 Companies in each cluster. These clusters are similar to the school clusters of the Ministry of Education.

The Brigade Office

The Brigade Office implements the strategic plans developed by the Brigade Executive.

Companies

Each BB company is managed by a partnership of members from the sponsoring church and the school where the company is based, if present. They are led by the Chaplain and Captain from the church, and typically assisted by a team of Teachers-in-Charge of the school. Assisting them are Officers, Primers and other VALs either from the church, from other churches or as former members of the Company.

BB Companies are identified by a unique number, with an exception of companies catered for the Primers Programme. In general, the smaller the number is, the earlier the company was founded. For example, the 1st Singapore Company has the longest history in Singapore. While this is true for most companies, the same cannot be said for certain companies as the number was "recycled" (especially in the 1980s and early 1990s). The majority of the companies are catered for the Seniors Programme. Companies with a "J" indicate the Juniors Programme. Every company also has a sponsoring school where new boys are recruited annually, and weekly parades are held.

The BB companies in Singapore are divided into 10 clusters – North 1, North 2, North 3, East 1, East 2, South 1, South 2, West 1, West 2 and West 3. Each company is categorised into the appropriate cluster based on its geographical location on Singapore island.

Programmes 
There are four programmes for different age groups:
 Explorers Programme - 3 to 6 years old (Kindergarten)
 Juniors Programme – 8 to 11 years old (Primary 3 to Primary 6)
 Seniors Programme – 12 to 16 years old (Secondary 1 to Secondary 4 or 5)
 Primers Programme – 17 to 19 years (Post-Secondary, Junior Colleges/Polytechnics/Institutes of Technical Education, girls are eligible to enrol in this programme)

Ranks
Boys
The ranks in the Seniors Programme include:
Recruit (REC)
Private (PTE)
Lance Corporal (LCP)
Corporal (CPL)
Sergeant (SGT)
Staff Sergeant (SSG)
Warrant Officer (WO)

Primers
This ranks attainable by Primers include:
Cadet Lieutenant (CLT)
Senior Cadet Lieutenant (SCL)

Officers
This ranks attainable by Officers include:
Officer Cadet (OCT)
Second Lieutenant (2LT)
Lieutenant (LTA)

Uniforms

Juniors' Programme
There are three different dress codes for the Juniors' Programme for various functions and occasions. These include, in decreasing formality, the Day Dress, the Fatigue Dress and the PT Kit.

Seniors' Programme
There are five different dress codes for the Seniors' Programme for various functions and occasions. These include, in decreasing formality, the Ceremonial Dress, the Day Dress, the Musketry, the Fatigue Dress and the PT Kit.

Primers
There are four different dress codes for the Primers' Programme for various functions and occasions. These include, in decreasing formality, the Ceremonial Dress, the Day Dress, the Musketry and the Fatigue Dress.

Officers
There are six different dress codes for BB Officers for various functions and occasions. These include, in decreasing formality, the Ceremonial Dress, the Function Dress, the Day Dress, the Musketry, the Fatigue Dress and the PT Kit.

Badges and awards

Juniors' Programme

Seniors' Programme

Primers' Programme

Community
The Boys' Brigade in Singapore aims to play an active role in contributing to society, and to inculcate these values to the Boys.

BB CARES
BB CARES, which stands for Community Activities Rallying Everyone to Serve involved BB companies organising activities to benefit welfare organisations of their choice. It is one of the events as part of the annual President's Challenge event.

Boys' Brigade Share-a-Gift
The Boys' Brigade Share-a-Gift (BBSG), previously known as The Boys' Brigade Sharity Gift Box, is a major annual event held during the Christmas period whereby more than 3,500 BB Officers and Boys, along with volunteers from other various groups, are mobilised to help collect gifts such as food and beverages from people and distribute these items to the needy in Singapore. These beneficiaries include the disabled, welfare homes, the elderly, and low-income families. There are also wishes from the beneficiaries that people can help to fulfill with, such as those requesting for food or household items, or toys and mattresses from children or the elderly.

Since the BBSG was started in 1988, it has been largely successful and has received great support from Singaporeans who have generously donated gifts over the years. From around 7,000 gifts collected in 1988, it has collected 428,000 gifts in 2006. Although the project did not meet its target donation by the close of the project on some occasions, the public would often continue to donate such that target was achieved within the next few weeks. In the last fifteen years, the BB has been working hand in hand with the National Council of Social Service (NCSS).

On 7 July 2013, the Boys' Brigade Share-a-Gift (BBSG) project was conferred the Singapore Youth Award Medal of Commendation.  BBSG was recognised for achieving, contributing and inspiring youths at significantly higher levels after being awarded the Singapore Youth Award in 2004.

Boys' Brigade Learning Centre
The Boys' Brigade Learning Centre (BBLC) is an educational facility built and maintained by the Boys' Brigade in Proyouth Village, Puok Commune, Cambodia.

Notable alumni
Chua Siak Phuang – Last founding member of the first Boys' Brigade Company in Singapore who died in 2010.
Winston Choo - First Chief of Defence Force of the Singapore Armed Forces from 1974–1992 and held the rank of Lieutenant-General.
RADM Aaron Beng Yao Cheng - Singapore Chief of Navy and upcoming 11th Chief of Defence Force of the Singapore Armed Forces on 24 March 2023.
Andie Chen - Singaporean Actor, former BB Boy from 26th Company, Tanglin Secondary.
Chiam See Tong - former Leader of the Opposition and Member of Parliament for Potong Pasir SMC.
khoo Boon Hui - former Commissioner of the Singapore Police Force.

See also
Boys' Brigade
Boys' Brigade Learning Centre, Cambodia

References

External links
The Boys' Brigade in Singapore Official Site

Youth organisations based in Singapore
Singaporean voluntary welfare organisations
Boys' Brigade